Memoria refers to one of five canons in classical rhetoric.

Memoria, or Memorias (Spanish), or Memórias (Portuguese) may also refer to:

Books and texts
 Memoria Apostolorum, lost text of the New Testament apocrypha
Memorias, Spanish-language memoir by Leonor López de Córdoba
Memórias Póstumas de Brás Cubas, Portuguese-language novel by Machado de Assis

Films
 Memoria (2015 film), based on James Franco's story "Palo Alto"
 Memoria (2021 film), an internationally co-produced drama film

Music

Albums
 Memorias (Camilo Sesto album), or its title track, 1976
 Memoria, 2004, by Cuban singer Polo Montañez
 Memoria (album), 2004, by the Argentine band Erreway
 In Memoria: Medieval Songs of Remembrance, 2007, by The Clerks Group
 Memorias (Grupo Bryndis album), 2011

Songs
 "Memoria" (Erreway song), 2004, by Erreway from the album Memoria
"Memoria", 2011, by Japanese singer Eir Aoi
 "Memoria" (GFriend song), 2018, by South Korean girl group GFriend

Other
 1247 Memoria, asteroid
 The Dark Eye: Memoria, a 2013 video game by Daedalic Entertainment

See also
 Memory (disambiguation)
 In Memoriam (disambiguation)